Colonial Country Club is a private golf club in Memphis, Tennessee, United States, in the Cordova neighborhood. For many years, it was host to an annual PGA Tour event.

History 
The club was founded in 1913 by some local businessmen in what was then called White Station, Tennessee.

The first 18-hole course was opened on August 7, 1914. In 1915 the first clubhouse opened.

On December 16, 1919, the clubhouse was destroyed in a fire, blamed on defective wiring. In the summer of 1921, a new clubhouse opened.

Colonial Country Club remained in this location for over forty years. In 1968, the club announced plans to relocate in Cordova near Interstate 40.The new venue would offer two separate 18-hole championship golf courses, as well as a  practice area, a  clubhouse, an Olympic sized swimming pool, 6 tennis courts, and snack-bar/dressing facility. Both courses were designed by Joe Finger. The new clubhouse and courses opened in 1972. Colonial Country Club has been located there ever since.

Courses 
The two courses are known as the North Course and the South Course. The South Course is the course which hosted the professional tour events.

Tournaments 
Colonial has hosted many tournaments at both of its locations, including the Memphis Open, now known as the St. Jude Classic. This PGA Tour event began in 1958 and was played at Colonial through 1988. Many years, regional qualifying for the U.S. Open has taken place at Colonial.

1977
1977 was the most memorable year for Colonial as two huge events occurred which made national news at the PGA Tour event (then known as the Danny Thomas Memphis Classic).

1. President Gerald Ford made a hole-in-one during Wednesday's Celebrity Pro-Am.

2. Two days later, Al Geiberger shot a record low round of 59 on Friday of the tournament.  The 13-under-par round remains a record in relation to par on the PGA Tour.  (Although Jim Furyk shot a 58 at the 2016 Travelers Championship, it was a Par 70 course, 12 under par).

Champions
Champions of the PGA Tour events held at Colonial:

Federal Express St. Jude Classic
1988 Jodie Mudd    
1987 Curtis Strange   
1986 Mike Hulbert

St. Jude Memphis Classic 
1985 Hal Sutton (playoff)

Danny Thomas Memphis Classic    
1984 Bob Eastwood    
1983 Larry Mize    
1982 Raymond Floyd   
1981 Jerry Pate    
1980 Lee Trevino    
1979 Gil Morgan (playoff)     
1978 Andy Bean (playoff)     
1977 Al Geiberger   
1976 Gibby Gilbert    
1975 Gene Littler   
1974 Gary Player    
1973 Dave Hill   
1972 Lee Trevino    
1971 Lee Trevino   
1970 Dave Hill

Memphis Open Invitational    
1969 Dave Hill  
1968 Bob Lunn    
1967 Dave Hill    
1966 Bert Yancey   
1965 Jack Nicklaus (playoff)   
1964 Mike Souchak    
1963 Tony Lema (playoff)    
1962 Lionel Hebert (playoff)   
1961 Cary Middlecoff    
1960 Tommy Bolt (playoff)

Memphis Open   
1959 Don Whitt (playoff) 
1958 Billy Maxwell

References

External links 
Official Site

Golf clubs and courses in Tennessee
Buildings and structures in Shelby County, Tennessee
Sports venues in Memphis, Tennessee